The women's 5000 metres race of the 2013–14 ISU Speed Skating World Cup 3, arranged in the Alau Ice Palace, in Astana, Kazakhstan, was held on 29 November 2013.

Martina Sáblíková of the Czech Republic won the race, while Claudia Pechstein of Germany came second, and Yvonne Nauta of the Netherlands came third. Carlijn Achtereekte of the Netherlands won the Division B race.

Results
The race took place on Friday, 29 November, with Division B scheduled in the afternoon session, at 13:52, and Division A scheduled in the evening session, at 18:38.

Division A

Division B

References

Women 5000
3